Gimpo Solteo Football Field is a football-specific stadium in Gimpo, South Korea. The stadium has a capacity for 5,076 spectators and is the home ground of K League 2 team Gimpo FC.

References

External links
 Gimpo FC official website 

Football venues in South Korea
Sports venues in Gyeonggi Province
Sports venues completed in 2015
2015 establishments in South Korea
K League 2 stadiums